Unification Day is a public holiday in Cameroon. It is the day of the 1st October 1961 plebiscite when former British mandated territory of Cameroon voted overwhelmingly to reunite with the former French mandated territory of Cameroon, both of whom had been separated from German Kamerun after the defeat of the Germans. Both territories were one under German administration and decided to reunite to form one big nation as it was under the Germans this time under a Federal system of governance. The country's constitutional history then evolved by popular acceptance in a referendum to the United Republic of Cameroon in 1972 and then to the Republic of Cameroon in 1984. Ever since the former mandated territory of British Cameroon, also known as Southern Cameroon, has felt marginalised in the Union. This has created a nostalgic feeling of wanting to return to the 1961 Federal system. As a revolt, they have always wanted 1 October to be remembered and celebrated as independence and reunification day. Cameroon's independence from the United Kingdom and unification with French Cameroun in 1961. This is not to be confused with the anniversary of French Cameroun's independence from France, an event which occurred on 1 January 1960.

References

 Wright, Susannah, ed. (2006). Cameroon. Madrid: MTH Multimedia S.L.

Cameroonian culture
Cameroon
October observances